Capodimonte is a comune (municipality) in the Province of Viterbo in the Italian region Lazio, located about  northwest of Rome and about  northwest of Viterbo. It is on the southwestern shore of Lake Bolsena. In contrast to the other communities on the lake, Capodimonte has a headland with a sheltered harbor.

Capodimonte borders the following municipalities via the common border, the lake: Bolsena, Gradoli, Latera, Marta, Montefiascone, Piansano, San Lorenzo Nuovo, Tuscania, Valentano.

References

Cities and towns in Lazio